Trent Nelson-Bond (born 30 December 1979 in Sydney) is an Australian ice dancer. He competed with Natalie Buck. They are the 2002–2006 Australian national champions. They have competed five times at the World Figure Skating Championships and six times at the Four Continents Championships. Their highest placing was 12th at the 2004 and 2006 Four Continents.

Before teaming up with Buck, Nelson-Bond competed with Danielle Rigg-Smith, with whom he was the 1999 National Champion.

They retired from competitive skating following the 2005–06 Olympic season.

Competitive highlights
(with Rigg-Smith)

(with Buck)

References

External links
 
 Ice Dance.com profile
 Trent Nelson-Bond home page

Australian male ice dancers
1979 births
Living people
Figure skaters from Sydney